William McCarter (23 October 1888 – 4 September 1941) was an Australian rules footballer who played for Geelong in the Victorian Football League (VFL).

A back pocket player, McCarter made his debut for Geelong in 1913 in round 1 against Richmond at Corio Oval. He did not play from 1916 to 1920 because of war service but was at his best when he returned in 1921, supposedly being named Geelong's club champion. He certainly won such an award in 1923, before retiring the following season. During his career he represented Victoria five times at interstate football.

References

External links

 

1888 births
1941 deaths
Australian rules footballers from Victoria (Australia)
Geelong Football Club players
Carji Greeves Medal winners
East Geelong Football Club players
Australian military personnel of World War I